Kadriye Selimoğlu (born June 1, 1978 in Rize, Turkey) is a world champion Turkish female Taekwondo practitioner competing in the finweight class. She is a member of the Istanbul B.B. SK.

She began Taekwondo already in her early age of 13 and became national champion in her age category. Selimoğlu studied in physical education and sports at the Gazi University in Ankara. She works as a teacher of physical education.

She is winner of the gold medal at the 2001 World Taekwondo Championships held in Jeju City, South Korea.

Achievements

  1996 European Youth Championships - Zagreb, Croatia -49 kg
  1996 European Championships - Helsinki, Finland -47 kg
  1999 World Championships - Edmonton, Canada -47 kg
  2000 European Championships - Patras, Greece -47 kg
  2001 World Championships - Jeju City, South Korea -47 kg 
  2002 European Championships - Samsun, Turkey -47 kg
  2004 European Championships - Lillehammer, Norway  -47 kg
  2008 A-Class German Open - Hamburg, Germany  -47 kg
  2008 European Championships - Rome, Italy -47 kg
  2009 A-Class Spanish Open - Alicante, Spain -46 kg
  2010 A-Class Dutch Open - Eindhoven, Netherlands -46 kg
  2010 European Team Championships - Baku, Azerbaijan team

References

External links

1978 births
Sportspeople from Rize
Living people
Gazi University alumni
Turkish female taekwondo practitioners
Turkish female martial artists
Istanbul Büyükşehir Belediyespor athletes
Turkish schoolteachers
World Taekwondo Championships medalists
European Taekwondo Championships medalists
20th-century Turkish sportswomen
21st-century Turkish sportswomen